Bilanday Bodjona (born 25 May 1962) is a Togolese athlete. He competed in the men's long jump at the 1984 Summer Olympics.

References

External links
 

1962 births
Living people
Athletes (track and field) at the 1984 Summer Olympics
Togolese male long jumpers
Olympic athletes of Togo
Place of birth missing (living people)
21st-century Togolese people